Sir George Christopher Molesworth Birdwood  (8 December 183228 June 1917) was an Anglo-Indian official, naturalist, and writer.

Life
The son of General Christopher Birdwood, he was born at Belgaum, then in the Bombay Presidency, on 8 December 1832. He was educated at Plymouth Grammar School and Edinburgh University, where he took his MD degree presenting the thesis "The origin of ideas". Entering the Bombay Medical Service in 1854, he served in the Persian War of 1856-57, and subsequently became professor at the Grant Medical College, registrar of the university, curator of the museum, and sheriff at Bombay, besides acting as secretary of the Asiatic and Horticultural societies.

Birdwood interested himself also in the municipal life of Bombay, where he acquired influence and popularity. He was obliged by ill-health in 1868 to return to England, where he entered the revenue and statistics department of the India Office (1871–1902).

In the dedication to his English translation of Garcia de Orta's book, Clements Markham calls Birdwood the "Garcia da Orta of British India". He kept up his connection to India with contributions to the Indian press; and established longterm friendships with Indian princes and educated Indians. In 1846 he was selected Sheriff of Bombay In 1887 he was created a Knight Commander of the Order of the Indian Empire; and, besides being given his Doctor of Laws degree by the University of Cambridge, he was also made an officer of the Légion d'Honneur and a laureate of the French Academy.

While chairing the Indian Section of the annual meeting of the Royal Society of Arts in 1910, Birdwood declared that there was no "fine art" in India. When a particular statue of the Buddha was adduced as counter-example, Birdwood is said to have responded: "This senseless similitude, in its immemorial fixed pose, is nothing more than an uninspired brazen image. . . . A boiled suet pudding would serve equally well as a symbol of passionless purity and serenity of soul."

Birdwood died in Ealing on 28 June 1917.

Works
 The Economic Vegetable Products of the Bombay Presidency (12th edition, 1868) 
 On the Genus Boswellia [Frankincense Trees] (1870)
 The Industrial Arts of India (1888)
 Reports on the Old Records of the India Office (1891)
 The Register of Letters and of the Governor and Company of Merchants of London Trading into the East Indies 1600-1619 (1893) with Sir William Foster
 First Letter Book of the East India Company (1895)

Birdwood published on the industrial arts of India, the ancient records of the India Office, and the first letter-book of the East India Company.  He encouraged Indian arts, on various aspects of which he wrote monographs, and his name was identified with the representation of India at the major International Exhibitions from 1857 to 1901. His researches on the subject of incense, became a classic.  

When still young, Birdwood contributed to magazines and newspapers; in India he helped to convert the Standard into The Times of India, and edited the Bombay Saturday Review; and after his return to London he wrote for the Pall Mall, Athenaeum, Academy, and The Times; and with Thomas Chenery, the editor of The Times, and others he took the initiative (1882) in celebrating the anniversary of Lord Beaconsfield's death as Primrose Day (19 April).

Notes

References

Further reading

1832 births
1917 deaths
People educated at Dollar Academy
Indian Medical Service officers
Knights Commander of the Order of the Indian Empire
British military personnel of the Anglo-Persian War
Officiers of the Légion d'honneur
Alumni of the University of Edinburgh
19th-century English medical doctors
Sheriffs of Mumbai
Alumni of the University of Edinburgh Medical School
People associated with the University of Edinburgh